St. George Cathedral is a Romanian Catholic cathedral located in Canton, Ohio, United States. It is the seat of the Eparchy of St. George's in Canton.

History
Romanian immigrants started to arrive in the Canton area at the turn of the Twentieth Century.  Romanian Catholics formed St. George parish in 1912 and the present church was dedicated in 1975.  It became a cathedral when the Apostolic Exarchate of United States of America was formed for Romanian Catholics in 1982.

See also
List of Catholic cathedrals in the United States
List of cathedrals in the United States

References

External links
 Official Cathedral Site
 Official Site of Eparchy

Christian organizations established in 1912
Churches completed in 1975
Romanian-American culture in Ohio
Eastern Catholic churches in Ohio
Eastern Catholic cathedrals in Ohio
Churches in Canton, Ohio
Churches in Stark County, Ohio
1912 establishments in Ohio